Hugh Gustafson (born 8 July 1987) is a Welsh rugby union player. A prop forward or hooker, he currently plays his club rugby for Pontypool RFC and Newport Gwent Dragons regional team. He has been capped by Wales at Under 16, Under 18, Under 19 and Under 20 levels.

References

External links
Newport Gwent Dragons profile

Welsh rugby union players
Pontypool RFC players
Dragons RFC players
1987 births
Living people
Rugby union players from Carmarthen
Ospreys (rugby union) players
Rugby union hookers
Rugby union props